Checkers Drive-In Restaurants, Inc. is a chain of double drive-thru restaurants in the United States. The company operates Checkers and Rally's restaurants in 28 states, and the District of Columbia. They specialize in hamburgers, hot dogs, french fries, and milkshakes.

Overview

Originally separate companies serving different geographic areas (with Checkers serving the Southeast and Rally's serving the Midwest), Checkers and Rally's merged in August 1999. Generally speaking, the Checkers name remains used in the Southeast as well as the Northeast while the Rally's name remains used in the Midwest as well as California; the two brands have overlap in several areas.

The merged company is headquartered in Tampa, Florida. Most locations specialize in carryout service with drive-thru and walk-up windows available, but no indoor seating, though some legacy Rally's locations in the Midwest retain dining rooms, as well as a Checkers location with an indoors dining area in Clearwater, FL..
Checkers was founded in 1986 in Mobile, Alabama, by Jim Mattei, and went public in 1991. Rally's was founded in Louisville, Kentucky in 1985 by Jim Patterson. In 1991 and 1992, Rally's absorbed Maxie's of America, Snapps Drive-Thru, and Zipps Drive-Thru.

In 1996, Rally's was bought by CKE Restaurants, parent company of Carl's Jr. and Hardee's. CKE sold Rally's to Checkers in 1999. Unlike the two CKE chains (which have at various points flip flopped between marketing Carl's Jr. & Hardee's as one chain or separate regional chains that both share Carl's Jr's Happy Star logo and imaging, but have largely separate menus), Checkers promptly merged Rally's into its branding, and the two chains are now only different by name.

In June 2006, the company went private through a merger with Taxi Holdings Corp., an affiliate of Wellspring Capital Management, a private equity firm. In 2014, Wellspring sold Checkers to another private equity firm, Sentinel Capital Partners. On March 23, 2017, Checkers announced that it would be sold to Oak Hill Capital Partners for $525 million. The sale was completed a month later.

On May 23, 2018, Checkers announced a planned expansion for over two dozen locations in the Pittsburgh area. Despite Rally's having brand recognition in the area the locations were to be branded as Checkers. The company made its official return in the area in 2019 under the Rally's brand with the opening of a location in Penn Hills. The company hasn't opened any more locations in the area since due to the COVID-19 pandemic.

In February 2020, Checkers & Rally's named Frances Allen, former CEO of Boston Market, as their new CEO.

Advertising and promotions

One of the first advertising campaigns by Checkers and Rally's from 1999 to late 2000 featured the slogan "High Performance Human Fuel".  The television advertisements for the campaign were animated in an anime style, featuring a woman named Holly, in pursuit of fast food. The ads were created by Crispin Porter & Bogusky, and illustrated by Peter Chung, who was also responsible for the animation of C.O.P.S and Ring Raiders.

In September 2007, ML Rogers, an advertising agency, won the advertising rights for Checkers Restaurants, and completely restructured the advertising campaign. Among the many changes is their new slogan, "little place. BIG TASTE", beginning October 2007. In 2007, the chain used a character called Rap Cat, a stuffed animal cat who performs a rap song about the chain. The ad campaign became popular after it became a viral video on YouTube. The company gave away paper bags patterned like a basketball jersey to be worn by cats, with slots to cut out for the legs and tail, and asked customers to post videos of their cat wearing it to a Rap Cat website. This received criticism from animal rights activists, though Checkers stated that the packaging was "intended only as a creative extension of our television campaign."

In September 2014, they started to have a character called Mr. Bag, a talking bag who appears in the new commercials for Checkers and Rally's.

In September 2016, rapper and restaurateur Rick Ross stated his plans for a partnership with Checkers and Rally's, including ownership of a few franchises. He opened his first franchise location in Miami in early 2017.

Security and privacy 
On May 29, 2019, Checkers and Rally's disclosed a long-running data breach that affected an unknown number of customers at 103 of its Checkers and Rally's locations, with some being infected with a point-of-sale malware as early as 2015.

References

External links

 – Checkers
 – Rally's

Companies based in Mobile, Alabama
Companies based in Louisville, Kentucky
Companies based in Tampa, Florida
Economy of the Eastern United States
Economy of the Southwestern United States
Fast-food chains of the United States
Restaurant chains in the United States
Private equity portfolio companies
Fast-food hamburger restaurants
Fast-food franchises
1986 establishments in Alabama
1985 establishments in Kentucky
2006 mergers and acquisitions
2017 mergers and acquisitions